The title of Earl of Wigtown (or Wigton or Wigtoun) was created twice in the Peerage of Scotland.  The first creation was in 1341 for Malcolm Fleming, and was surrendered in 1372, when the second Earl sold the Earldom and territory to Archibald the Grim, Lord of Galloway. The transfer was confirmed by Robert III later in the same year. The Douglas family, Earls of Douglas, held the Earldom of Wigtown for the next hundred years, until the attainder of the 9th Earl of Douglas in 1455.

The second creation was in 1606 for John Fleming, and survived until the death of the 7th earl in 1747, when it became dormant (or extinct). The earls of the second creation bore the subsidiary titles of Lord Fleming and Cumbernauld (1606) and of Lord Fleming (1451, Peerage of Scotland, extinct 1747).

Earls of Wigtown, First Creation (1341)
Malcolm Fleming, 1st Earl of Wigtown (d. c. 1363)
Thomas Fleming, 2nd Earl of Wigtown (d. x 1382), title surrendered 1372

Douglas Earls
Archibald Douglas, 3rd Earl of Douglas
Archibald Douglas, 4th Earl of Douglas
Archibald Douglas, 5th Earl of Douglas
William Douglas, 6th Earl of Douglas
James Douglas, 7th Earl of Douglas
William Douglas, 8th Earl of Douglas
James Douglas, 9th Earl of Douglas

Lords Fleming (1451)
Robert Fleming, 1st Lord Fleming or Malcolm Fleming, 1st Lord Fleming (d. 1494)
John Fleming, 2nd Lord Fleming (d.1524)
Malcolm Fleming, 3rd Lord Fleming (c.1494–1547)
James Fleming, 4th Lord Fleming (b.1538–1558)
John Fleming, 5th Lord Fleming (d. 1572)
John Fleming, 6th or 7th Lord Fleming (1567–1619) became Earl of Wigtown in 1606

Earls of Wigtown, Second Creation (1606)
John Fleming, 1st Earl of Wigtown (1567–1619)
John Fleming, 2nd Earl of Wigtown (1589–1650)
John Fleming, 3rd Earl of Wigtown (d.1665)
John Fleming, 4th Earl of Wigtown (d.1668)
William Fleming, 5th Earl of Wigtown (d.1681)
John Fleming, 6th Earl of Wigtown (1673–1744)
Charles Fleming, 7th Earl of Wigtown (1675–1747)

References

Extinct earldoms in the Peerage of Scotland
History of Galloway
Dormant earldoms in the Peerage of Scotland
Noble titles created in 1341
Noble titles created in 1606